Sherwood Pictures is an American independent Christian film production company in Albany, Georgia, United States. It is unusual among production companies in that it is a ministry of a local church, Sherwood Baptist Church. The company uses mostly volunteers in their productions. It was founded in 2003 by Alex Kendrick, the associate pastor of media for Sherwood Baptist Church with $20,000 in donations.

The company's first film was Flywheel (2003), but it is best known for Facing the Giants (2006), Fireproof (2008), the highest-grossing independent film of the year, Courageous (2011), and Courageous Legacy (2021).  The Kendrick Brothers have also produced War Room (2015), Overcomer (2019), Show Me the Father (2021), and Lifemark (2022) although they're not Sherwood Pictures films.

History 
Sherwood Pictures was founded in 2003 by Alex Kendrick, the associate pastor of media for Sherwood Baptist Church with $20,000 in donations. Kendrick has also written and directed each of Sherwood's films. The budget of each film has been significantly larger than the film directly previous, at $20,000 for Flywheel, $100,000 for Facing the Giants, $500,000 for Fireproof, $2 million for Courageous, $3 million for War Room, and $5 million for Overcomer.

Sherwood's films have earned back their budgets dozens of times over. Facing the Giants made 102 times its budget, Fireproof earned 67 times its budget, and Courageous made eight times its budget in its first ten days in theaters.

In 2011, The Hollywood Reporter wrote about Sherwood's increasing success:

In 2013, Alex Kendrick and his two brothers left the Sherwood Pictures department to found the production company Kendrick Brothers.

Filmography 
 Flywheel (2003)
 Facing the Giants (2006)
 Fireproof (2008)
 Courageous (2011)
 Courageous Legacy (2021)

Cast

References

External links 
 Official company website

 
Christian mass media companies
Companies based in Dougherty County, Georgia
Christian film production companies
Film production companies of the United States